Randall  is a masculine given name in English, Irish and German. Its modern use as a given name originates from the transferred use of the English–language surname Randall, which in turn is derived from Randolph.

There are several variant spellings of the English given name; these include Randal, Randel, Randell, Randle, Randoll, and Rendell. The form Randal has also been used as an Anglicisation of an etymologically unrelated Irish and Scottish Gaelic name, Raghnall. This Anglicisation has been noted as being particularly common amongst several Irish families of note. Randal has not been among the 1,000 most popular masculine baby names in the United States since 1994, and Randall has been among the top 1,000 names since 1906. According to US Census data, in 1990 both names were among the top 500 most popular masculine names in the country. Neither name is currently among the 100 most popular masculine (or feminine) baby names in either the United Kingdom or the Republic of Ireland.

Etymology and early history

The modern given name Randall, is derived from the transferred use of the surname Randall. There have been two explanations for the origin of this surname. One explanation is that the surname is derived from the Middle English personal name Randel. This name is a diminutive of the mediaeval personal name Rand compounded with the Anglo Norman hypocoristic suffix -el. The Middle English Rand can be a short form of any of several names composed of the first element rand, meaning "shield" or "rim"; or the Old Norse short first name Randr (variant form Randi, Old Danish Rand), however the specific names associated with Randel are Randulf and Randolf—names that were brought to England by the Normans. Another explanation for the surname Randall, is that it is merely an apocopal form, or mediaeval vernacular form of Randolf.

The Norman personal names Randulf and Randolf are ultimately derived from the Old Norse Rannúlfr, when the short form Randr (Old Danish Rand) is probably the first part of Norman toponyms such as Randal (Manche, le Vrétot, maybe from *Randdalr, a compound with dalr "valley", same as Randale, hamlet in England), Rantot (Manche, farm at Digulleville maybe from *Randtopt with topt > -tot "toft") and Ranville. In fact, Rannúlfr was introduced into England by Scandinavians well before the arrival of the Norman name, and because of the introduction of the form used by the Normans, both names were reinforced in England. The Old Norse Rannúlfr is composed of two elements—the first element is rand, meaning "shield" or "rim"; the second element is úlfr, meaning "wolf". The Old English form of these names is Randwulf (similarly composed of rand and wulf). Other cognates include: the Old Low German Randwulf, Randulf; and the Old Norse Röndúlfr.

There are several early occurrences in British sources of the names that gave rise to the modern given name Randall. An early occurrence of the modern surname is: Richard Randall, in 1547 (in Huntingdonshire, England). A mediaeval occurrence of the surname is: Thomas Randel, in 1250 (in Suffolk, England). An early occurrence of the short form Rand is: Rande de Borham, in 1299. An early occurrence of Randel (a diminutive of Rand) is: Randal, in 1204 (in Yorkshire, England). An early occurrence of the mediaeval personal names Randolf, Randulf is: Randulfus, in about 1095 (in the Assize Rolls of Yorkshire, England); another is: Nicolaus filius Randulphi, in the years spanning 1175–86 (in Norfolk, England).

According to etymologist P. H. Reaney, the mediaeval name Randulf was commonly confused with Old German Rannulf. This Old German name is composed of elements meaning "raven" and "wolf", and was introduced into England around the same time as Randulf. One example where the unrelated names were confused and given to the same individual in different records is: Randolphus de Brachenberch, in about 1155; and Ranulfus de Brachinberge, in 1160–6 (both names recorded in Lincolnshire, England).

Variant forms and pet forms

Variant spellings of the given name Randall include: Randal, Randel, Randell, Randle, and Rendell. Randal is also used as an Anglicised form of the Irish and Scottish Gaelic Raghnall (to which it is etymologically unrelated). Although Randal is generally Gaelicised as Raghnall in Ireland (and sometimes Rághnall), the Irish Rannulbh more accurately represents Randulph and Randulf.

Use and popularity

In Scotland, the name Randal has been associated with Lord Randal, an Anglo-Scottish border ballad, published by American Francis James Child in 1882 (see Child Ballads). In parts of Ireland in the 19th and early 20th century, the name Randal has been noted being used particularly by families of the surname MacDonnell (the surname was/is spelt variously). There are several notable Irish families, historically unrelated to each other, who bear (forms of) this surname. The chiefly line of one such family relocated to the Glens of Antrim from Scotland in the 16th and 17th centuries, and Randal appears numerous times in their pedigree; this family descends from members of the Scottish Clan Donald; and even today, various Anglicised forms of the Gaelic Raghnall are commonly used by members of this clan. Randal was noted in the early 20th century as being common within the O'Donovan family as well; their name, like that of Clan Donald, originated as an Anglicised form of the etymologically unrelated Raghnall.

Since 1906, Randall has been among the top 1,000 names recorded in Social Security card applications for baby boys in the United States. The name was at its most popular point in 1955, when it was ranked the 53rd most popular masculine baby name. Currently, the name was ranked 749th for the year 2009. Randall currently is, and historically has been more popular in the United States than the various other forms of the name. For example, since 1995, Randal has not been among the top 1,000 names recorded in for baby boys. This name first ranked within the top 1,000 boys names in 1938, and it stayed among the top 1,000 names until 1994; the name was at its most popular point in 1958, when it was ranked 189th. According to data released by the Social Security Administration, the forms Randell, Randel, and Randle have never been nearly as popular (see 'popularity graphs' below). In 1990, the United States Census Bureau undertook a study of the 1990 United States Census, and released a sample of data concerning the most popular names. According to this sample of 6.3 million people (who had 5,494 unique first names), Randal was ranked as the 477th most popular masculine name, and Randall was ranked 139th most popular. Neither name ranked among females in this sample.

Neither Randal or Randall ranked within the top 100 masculine (or feminine) baby names for the year 2009 in England and Wales; similarly so for Scotland. In both the Republic of Ireland and Northern Ireland, neither name ranked within the top 100 masculine (or feminine) names of registered births in 2009.

Popularity graphs

List of people with the given names

Randal
Alexander Randal Mark McDonnell born 1935, Ninth Earl of Antrim (1785 creation), in the Peerage of Ireland.
Randal Bays, musician.
Randal Beresford, died 1681, Second Beresford of Coleraine baronet, in the Baronetage of Ireland.
Randal E. Bryant, dean of School of Computer Science, at Carnegie Mellon University.
Randal Edwards, born 1984 Canada actor.
Randal Forbes Elliott 1922–2010 New Zealand eye surgeon and campaigner of safety glass.
Randal Haworth
Randal Hill, born 1969, United States American football player in the National Football League.
Randal Hollenbach, 1958, United States Air Force veteran and veterans advocate. Pennsylvania.
Randal Kleiser, born 1946, United States, film director.
Randal J. Kirk born c.1954 United States, businessman.
Randal Kolo Muani (born 1998), French footballer
Randal MacDonnell, died 1636 First Earl of Antrim, in the Peerage of Ireland.
Randal MacDonnell, 1609–1683 Second Earl of Antrim, and first Marquess of Antrim, in the Peerage of Ireland.
Randal MacDonnell 1680–1721 Fourth Earl of Antrim in the Peerage of Ireland.
Randal Robert Alexander Marlin, adjunct professor at Carleton University.
Randal McLelland, born 1985, United StatesAmerican Olympic athlete at the 2008 Summer Olympics.
Randal O'Toole, Cato Institute senior fellow, and author.
Randal Keith Orton, born 1980, United States, professional wrestler
Randal Pinkett born 1971 United States contestant on an American reality television show.
Randal Edward Sherborne Plunkett 1848–1883, Member of Parliament in the United Kingdom.
Randal Arthur Henry Plunkett 1906–1999, Nineteenth Baron of Dunsany, in the Peerage of Ireland.
Randal Howard Paul, born 1963 United States, politician
Randal Smith1898–1968, Second Baron Bicester, in the Peerage of the United Kingdom.
Randal Williams, born 1978 United States, American football player in the National Football League.
Randal R. Wisbey, President of La Sierra University.
Randal Woollatt (1909–1984), English cricketer
William Randal Cremer 1828–1908, recipient of the Nobel Prize for Peace in 1903.
William Randal McDonnell, 1851–1918	Sixth Earl of Antrim (1785 creation), in the Peerage of Ireland.

Randall
Randall Dale Adams, (born 1949), wrongly convicted of murder and sentenced to death
Randall Amster, (born 1966), American, author
Randall Azofeifa, (born 1984), Costa Rican, football (soccer) player
Randall B. Griepp, American, cardiothoracic surgeon
Randall B. Kester, (born 1916), American, attorney and judge
Randall Bailey, (born 1974), American, boxer
Randall Bal,
Randall Balmer, (born 1954), American, author
Randall Bass, American, scholar
Randall James Bayer,
Randall Batinkoff, (born 1968), American, actor
Randall Beer, American, scholar
Randall C. Berg, Jr., American, Executive Director of the Florida Justice Institute
Randall Bewley, (1955–2009), guitarist
Randall Boe, (born 1962), general counsel for AOL
Randall Bone, (born 1973), Australian rules footballer
Randall Bramblett, American, musician and singer-songwriter
Randall Brenes, (born 1983), Costa Rican, professional football (soccer) player
Randall Burks, (born 1953), American, American football player
Randall Carroll, (born 1991), American, American football player
Randall Cobb (disambiguation) - several people
Randall Cobb (American football), (born 1989), American, American football player
Randall "Tex" Cobb, (born 1950), American, boxer and actor
Randall Collins, (born 1941), American, academic
Randall Crane, academic
Randall Cunningham, (born 1963), American, American football player
Randall David Shughart, (1958–1993), American, soldier killed in action in Somalia
Randall Davidson, 1st Baron Davidson of Lambeth, (1848–1930), British, Anglican clergyman, Archbishop of Canterbury
Randall Dodd, founder and director of Financial Policy Forum
Randall Dougherty, (born 1961), mathematician
Randall Duell, (1903–1992), American, architect and art director
Randall Duk Kim, (born 1943), American, actor
Randall Edwards (disambiguation) - several people
Randall Edwards (actress), (born 1955), American, actor
Randall Edwards (politician), (born 1961), American, politician
Randall Einhorn, (born 1963), American, television director and cinematographer
Randall Faye, (1892–1948), American, screenwriter, film producer and director
Randall K. Filer (born 1952), American economist, supporter of economics education worldwide
Randall Craig Fleischer, American, conductor
Randall Forsberg, (1943–2007), American, anti-war activist
Randall M. Fort, (born 1956), American, member of the Intelligence and Research in the United States Department
Randall Frakes, author
Randall Franks, American actor, singer and musician
Randall Garrett, (1927–1987), American, author
Randall Garrison, Canadian politician
Randall Gay, (born 1982), American, American football player
Randall George Lewis MacAlister, Anglican priest
Randall L. Gibson,
Randall Giles, (1950–2010), American, music composer
Randall Godfrey, (born 1973), American, American football player
Randall Goff,
Randall Goforth (born 1994), American football player
Randall Gregory Holcombe, American, academic
Randall S. Harmon, (1903–1982), American, politician
Randall G. Hassell, karate instructor
Randall Hodgkinson, American, musician
Randall Hyde, (born 1956), American, author
Randall Jahnson, American, writer, director, and producer
Randall Jarrell, (1914–1965), American, author
Randall Kenan, (born 1963), American, author
Randall Kennedy, (born 1954), American, academic and author
Randall C. Kennedy, computer specialist
Randall Kleck, American, martial artist
Randall Kroszner, (born 1962), member of the Federal Reserve
Randall Kryn, (born 1949), Civil Rights Movement historian
Randall Luthi, (born 1955), American, attorney
Randall Maggs, Canadian, poet
Randall Mann, American, poet
Randall McDaniel, (born 1964), American, professional American football player
Randall Miller, American, film director
Randall Munroe, (born 1984), American, webcomic author
Randall Nieman, musician
Randall C. O'Reilly, (born 1967), academic
Randall Park, American, comedian and actor
Randall Parrish, (1858–1923), American, author
Randall Pinkston, (born 1950), correspondent for CBS News
Randall Ray Rader, (born 1949), American, Chief Judge of the United States Court of Appeals for the Federal Circuit
Randall "Randy" Roach (born 1951), American mayor 
Randall Robinson, (born 1941), American, lawyer, author, and activist
Randall Robinson (cinematographer), (born 1946), American, cinematographer
Randall Rollins (born 1931), American businessman
Randall Rothenberg, business executive
Randall Row, (born 1971), Costa Rican, footballer
Randall Schmidt, American, lieutenant general in the United States Air Force
Randall Schweller, American, academic
Randall Silvis, American, author
Randall Simon, (born 1975), professional baseball player
Randall Smith (disambiguation) - several people
Randall Smith, (born 1960), Canadian, musician
Randall Lee Smith, (died 2008), American, convicted murderer
Randall W. Spetman, (born 1953), American, athletic director at Florida State University
Randall J. Stephens, author
Randall L. Stephenson, (born 1960), American, business executive
Randall S. Street, (1780–1841), American, lawyer and politician
Randall J. Strossen, (born 1951), strength training writer
Randall Stout, American, architect
Randall Svane, (born 1955), American, composer
Randall Swingler, (1909–1967), English, poet, also awarded the Military Medal in the Second World War
Randall T. Shepard, (born 1946), Chief Justice of the Indiana Supreme Court
Randall Terry, (born 1959), American, anti-abortion activist
Randall L. Tobias, (born 1942), American, business executive
Randall Thompson (disambiguation) - several people
Randall Thompson, (1899–1984), American, composer
Randall Thompson (boxer)
Randall Tolson, (1912–1954), American, clockmaker
Randall Wallace, (born 1949), American, screenwriter, director, producer
Randall Weber, (born 1968), Canadian, ice hockey player
Randall Wells, (1877–1942), English, architect
Randall Wiebe, Canadian playwright
Randall Winston, television producer and director
Randall Woodfield, (born 1950), American, serial killer dubbed The I-5 Killer or The I-5 Bandit
Randall Woolf, American, composer
Randall Zindler, American, business executive
Randall Zisk, American, television director and producer
Randall Zwinge, American stage magician and scientific skeptic

Randell
Randell Kirsch, officer in the United States Army.

Notes

References

English masculine given names
German masculine given names
Given names originating from a surname